Inndyr is the administrative centre of the municipality of Gildeskål in Nordland county, Norway. The village lies along the Sørfjorden and it looks out to the west over the nearby islands of Fugløya, Fleina, and Femris.

There are two churches located on the northern edge of town:  Gildeskål Church and Old Gildeskål Church.  The new, larger church was built right next to the old church, although the old church is still used for services.

Climate
This climate type is dominated by the winter season, a long, bitterly cold period with short, clear days, relatively little precipitation mostly in the form of snow, and low humidity.  The Köppen Climate Classification sub-type for this climate is "Dfc" (Continental Subarctic Climate).

References

Gildeskål
Villages in Nordland
Populated places of Arctic Norway